The Ordre de l'Étoile d'Anjouan (Order of the Star of Anjouan) was a French colonial order of knighthood founded in 1874.

History
It was established in 1874 by sultan Said Ali bin Said Omar of the Grande Comore island of Anjouan, reorganised on 18 June 1892 and authorised and recognised by the French government on 12 September 1896. It was made a French Overseas Order in 1950.

In this case a local order was adopted by the French, although they reorganised and redesigned it. Another Anjouan order, the Star of Said Ali was not adopted.

The Ordre de l'Étoile d'Anjouan has five classes: Grand-Croix, Grand-Officier, Commandeur, Officier and Chevalier. It was not  awarded from the institution of the National Order of Merit on 3 December 1963. It was recreated in 1992 by the independent Comoros.

Recipients
 H. M. Cassime
 Grand-Crosses
 Raoul Magrin-Vernerey
 Pakubuwono X
 Grand-Officers
 Marie-Pierre Kœnig

References
 

1874 establishments in the French colonial empire
1963 disestablishments in the French colonial empire
Colonial orders of chivalry
Military awards and decorations of France
Military of the Comoros
Orders of chivalry of France
Anjouan
Orders, decorations, and medals of the Comoros
Awards established in 1874
Comoros–France relations